The Bogle–Chandler case refers to the mysterious deaths of Gilbert Bogle and Margaret Chandler on the banks of the Lane Cove River in Sydney, Australia on 1 January 1963. The case became famous because of the circumstances in which the bodies were found and because the cause of death could not be established. In 2006 a filmmaker discovered evidence to suggest the cause of death was hydrogen sulphide gas. In the early hours of 1 January an eruption of gas from the polluted river bed may have occurred, causing the noxious fumes to pool in deadly quantities in the grove.

Background
Gilbert Stanley Bogle, born in 1924, was a physicist who worked at the Commonwealth Scientific and Industrial Research Organisation (CSIRO) on the campus of the University of Sydney. Married with several children, he was considered to be a brilliant scientist and had been a Rhodes Scholar. The police discovered that Bogle had casual relationships with other women, some of whom he took to parks. The Coroner stood down a key female witness before she could give evidence, to protect her family and that of Bogle.

Margaret Olive Chandler (née Morphett), born in 1934, was married to Geoffrey Chandler, who worked in the same CSIRO building as Bogle. They had two children. Witnesses suggested that she may have been bored with her life and upset at her husband's philandering but, in reality, "free love" (free from guilty feelings) was normal practice in the Sydney Push connected to the university.

Bogle, the Chandlers, and several others attended a barbecue just prior to Christmas 1962. On the way home Chandler told her husband Geoffrey that she was quite taken with Bogle. Geoffrey told the police that he and his wife had "an understanding". He told her: "If you want to take Gib as a lover, if it would make you happy, you do it."

Chatswood party

Two of the other people at the barbecue were Ken and Ruth Nash. Ken Nash also worked at the CSIRO. He invited the Chandlers to his New Year's Eve dinner party, to be held at his home in Waratah Street, Chatswood.

The Chandlers arrived at about 10 p.m. for the party, with Geoffrey Chandler casually dressed. At about 11.30 p.m., Chandler departed alone and drove to a Sydney Push New Year's party held at the Balmain home of Ken Buckley, a senior lecturer in Economic History at the University of Sydney. Arriving there at about midnight, he met Pamela Logan, with whom he was having an affair. They drove in tandem to her lodgings at Darlington. Chandler returned to the Chatswood party at 2.30 a.m. but decided to depart alone, in accordance with Mrs Chandler's understood preference that she be driven home to Croydon by Bogle. The Chandlers' two children were in the care of their maternal grandparents at Granville.

Bogle and Chandler left the party soon after 4 a.m. and drove to the nearby Lane Cove River, which was known as a lovers' lane.  What happened next is still unclear but, several hours later, their bodies were found. At the subsequent inquest, medical evidence was given that Mrs Chandler had not had sexual intercourse.

Discovery of the bodies
Bogle's body was discovered near Fullers Bridge by two youths searching for golf balls. They saw his body and presumed him to be drunk. When they returned an hour later to find that he had not moved and that his face had turned blue, they went to fetch help.

When police arrived at the scene they discovered that Bogle's body was half-undressed. Somebody had placed his trousers over the back of his legs in such a way that he appeared to be dressed, but was not. A piece of carpet was also laid on top of his back underneath his jacket, which was laid perfectly on his back.

Shortly after this, Mrs Chandler's body was discovered a short distance away. She was also in a state of undress, and her body had been covered with a broken-up cardboard beer box. It was initially believed that she had covered Bogle's body first and then her own, but closer examination suggested that someone had covered her body as well.

Investigation
It was obvious that both had died from some sort of poisoning. At the scene were signs of vomit and excreta. Excreta from both victims along with items of clothing were found on the exposed bed of the river. Because New Year's Day was a public holiday, forensic examination of the bodies was delayed for 36 hours. When forensic examination did take place, no traces of any poison could be found.

The case attracted instant publicity. It involved a high-society party, alleged wife-swapping, an unidentified third person at the death scene, and an unidentified poison. There was also speculation that Bogle was involved in research important in the Cold War.

The inquest in May 1963 did not help to resolve the mystery. The coroner, Mr. J. J. Loomes, concluded that Bogle and Chandler had died because of  "...acute circulatory failure. But as to the circumstances under which such circulatory failure was brought about, the evidence does not permit me to say."  In other words, he stated that Bogle and Chandler died either because their hearts stopped beating, or they stopped breathing.

Poisoning theories
The police investigated hundreds of theories including the drug LSD. The state government analyst found no trace of LSD. In 1996 relic tissues were sent to America and new forensic techniques were applied to them. A first pass suggested the presence of LSD. A more sensitive scan on the same equipment came up negative—Bogle and Chandler had not used LSD. Against this, there have been no documented human deaths from an LSD overdose.

Hydrogen sulphide hypothesis

Peter Butt's documentary Who Killed Dr Bogle and Mrs Chandler?, which was shown on the ABC in September 2006, suggests that the two deaths were caused by accidental hydrogen sulphide poisoning.
Supporting evidence for this theory includes:
 In the 1940s and 50s, the local council received scores of letters from residents complaining of the smell of "rotten eggs" coming from the river, causing nausea and breathing difficulties. There was also a series of massive fish kills. With the residents facing permanent evacuation, the Maritime Services Board conducted a year-long study of the river. The source was identified as a factory that had pumped its waste into the river since the 1890s. The worst affected location was within a quarter-mile of the weir, exactly where Bogle and Chandler died.
 On New Year's Day, police divers reported a great disturbance of black river-bed sediment. Although their search of the river was then delayed for 11 days, visibility remained poor.
 The very cool, still weather conditions at time of death would have allowed high concentrations of gas to accumulate.
 The location where the couple had sought privacy was at water-level in a slight depression, surrounded by a bank and mangroves, typical of where the heavier-than-air hydrogen sulphide would accumulate in calm conditions.
 Slight skin abrasions, shoe and knee prints suggest both victims were disorientated and had tried to leave the depression before collapsing.
 Both victims had been unable to correct their clothing, suggesting that the poison struck them down without warning, at the same time and with great speed.
 A pathology report, suppressed by the coroner at the time, revealed semen on Bogle's body and coat. This suggests sex was taking place and that both victims could not have been suffering earlier effects of poisoning before they were suddenly struck down.
 Most importantly, a purple discoloration was seen in the victims' blood which is characteristic of hydrogen sulphide poisoning (This phenomenon is not related to other colour changes in the blood such as cyanosis, or methaemoglobin/methemoglobinemia).
 The toxicologist who tested the victims' tissue samples claimed that had he known about the semen, it would have eliminated the majority of poisons he had tested for. This knowledge he claimed, along with the hint provided by the purple colouration of the blood, might have led him to suspect that the poison was hydrogen sulphide.
 A British forensic scientist contacted by the police suggested, after reading the case report, that the victims had been gassed.

With hydrogen sulphide at a level of 1 ppm, a victim will barely notice a bad smell; at 30+ ppm  smells like rotten eggs but at 50-100 ppm it smells cloyingly sweet. At a level above 100 ppm,  paralyses the olfactory nerve (sense of smell) almost instantly and, as the gas is effectively invisible, it would not be noticed despite it leading to vomiting and breathlessness. At 200 ppm respiratory failure occurs within seconds. At 1000 ppm a single breath causes instant cardiac arrest. Although no levels were measured at the river, there is anecdotal evidence of levels of up to 100 ppm being common in the area on still days. As  is heavier than air, the gas tends to pool in hollows on calm days and needs a breeze in order to dissipate. If it is assumed that there was little or no gas around when Bogle and Chandler arrived and there was an eruption of gas upstream, the gas would seek the low points along the bank and at 100 - 150 ppm would be undetectable. The couple could remain for some time before feeling breathless and nauseous but would smell and see nothing to explain this. They would have become confused as a result of  binding with haemoglobin in the blood and reducing its oxygen-carrying capacity, making an escape difficult.

Conclusions
It was the investigating detectives' belief that the victims' bodies were covered not by a murderer, but by a 'third person' who covered them for modesty after discovering the bodies. An initial suspect was a voyeur who contacted police twice, using different names. After interrogation, he was quickly dismissed. The prime suspect was a greyhound trainer who slipped his dogs daily on a path that passed the site where the bodies were found. He came forward only after his car was identified and, when interviewed by police, claimed to have used a different path that day and denied seeing the bodies.  His obituary in 1977, however, claimed he had been the first to find the bodies. The theory regarding a motive of modesty for covering the bodies was supported by claims that the man was known to be a prude.

A woman who was a child at the time came forward at the time of the film's screening. She claimed she had found Mrs Chandler's handbag 4 km away in bushland between three houses. One of those houses was discovered to belong to a relative of the greyhound trainer and was near to his own home. A veteran greyhound racing steward also came forward and said that he received a call from the suspect soon after the deaths, during which he admitted that he had come across the bodies. In August 2016, author Peter Butt published details of an alleged 1965 conversation between a Canberra psychologist and a woman who had claimed to be an eyewitness of the deaths. The parties were not identified but their claimed evidence appeared generally consistent with original "crime scene" data and a conclusion that the deaths were caused by hydrogen sulphide gas.

See also
List of unsolved deaths

References

External links
Waterford, Jack.  
Brown, Russell. The Bogle-Chandler case. Unofficial project site at Wayback Machine, c 2005
Bogle Chandler Mystery Deaths—Collection of associated photographs, at Pinterest

1963 in Australia
January 1963 events in Australia
Lane Cove River
Married couples
Unsolved deaths in Australia